Killaloe may refer to:

Australia 

 Killaloe, Queensland, a rural locality in the Shire of Douglas

Canada 

 Killaloe, Ontario

Ireland 

Killaloe, County Clare
Killaloe (parish)
Killaloe, County Clare (Civil parish)
Diocese of Killaloe, County Clare
Roman Catholic Diocese of Killaloe, County Clare
Killaloe March, Regimental music of the Royal Irish Regiment